Zaza Reservoir is the largest man-made reservoir in Cuba.

Overview
It was developed on the course of the Zaza River, which flows from Sierra del Escambray to the Tunas Channel in the Caribbean Sea and is Cuba's second longest river (after Rio Cauto). Other rivers that empty into the reservoir include the Yayabo, Taguasco and Tuinucú Rivers.

The Zaza Dam was built over a 3-year period and was completed on December 7, 1971, at a cost of  27 million Cuban pesos. A hydroelectric plant was subsequently added in 1978.

The water of the reservoir is used to irrigate the farmlands to the south all the way to the Caribbean coast. Fishing (both leisure and commercial) is also an important activity on the reservoir. One of the largest fresh water fish in the world, arapaima gigas, was introduced to the waters in 1980. There are also other important fishes such as: Tilapia, Trout, Claria or Cat Fish.

References

Buildings and structures in Sancti Spíritus
Reservoirs in Cuba
Geography of Sancti Spíritus Province